Andrabi is a surname of Arab origin (Andrabi) mostly used by Syed's. Usually people whose origin is from (Andarab, Afghanistan) carry this surname.

Introduction
With the mass influx of Sufis from different parts of Central Asia and Persia during the last quarter of the fourteenth century, a new family of Andrabi Syeds came and settled in the serene and tranquil atmosphere of the valley. A message of equality was disseminated by them to all corners of the valley. Their teachings impressed the people in an impressive way and simultaneously people benefited from them in a variety of ways. As the result, in addition to religious education common masses were encouraged to learn other necessary disciplines.

Diffusion of Family
Syed Mir Mirak Andrabi had three sons, Syed Mohammad Andrabi, (d.1022.A.H/A.D,1614.A.D), Syed Mohammad Yousuf Andrabi, (d.1028.A.H./A.D,1620A.D), and Syed Qasim Ahmad Andrabi19. Syed Mohammad Andrabi played an important role in spreading the Quranic Education to far-off areas of the valley and was very popular, especially in the Gurez and Sopore areas of the valley. He is buried in the ancestral graveyard at Malaratta. Syed Muhammad Yousuf Andrabi was the second son of Syed Mir Mirak Andrabi. He spent most of his time in Dalgate and was also buried there. The third son Syed Qasim Ahmad Andrabi (d.1040A.H./1631.A.D) migrated to the adjacent area namely Puchal (Pulwama) and settled down there. The total population of village Puchal at present is approximately four thousand only, and the strata of Andrabis is only eight percent of the total population. The Andrabi Syeds of Ratnipora (Pulwama) are the descendants of Syed Mir Mirak Andrabi. Syed Shamsu’d-din Gamgeen Ratanpuri a Persian and Kashmiri poet was also one of the descendants of Syed Mir Mirak Andrabi. The total population of a village is ten thousand and twenty-five percent of the population is of Andrabi Syeds. Andrabi Syeds of Zadora Pulwama are also the descendants of Syed Mir Mirak Andrabi. Twenty percent of the population is of Andrabi Syeds. Few families of Andrabi Syeds are also at Karimabad (Pulwama), Tral (Pulwama) and Lajoora (Pulwama). The Andrabi Syeds of Nagum (Kulgam) popularly known as Damhal Hanjipora are very few in number. There are some families living at Qazigund (Anantnag) prominent among them was Syed Hafeez-ullah Andrabi, founder of Arabia College at Qazigund, few families are also at Bahram Sahib (Anantnag). Few families of Andrabi Syeds are at Kralpora (Chadoora-Budgam), and few families are also found at Wandhama (Ganderbal) etc. Baramulla Town and Garoora (Bandipora) are also areas of Andrabi Syeds. Some families of Andrabi Syeds are also at Kanthpora and Lolab (Kupwara). There are various living legends of the Andrabi dynasty and they are mostly found in rural areas of the Pulwama district such as Puchal,  Ratnipora and Zadora, Kralpora (Chadoora), and Kanthpora (Kupwara). They had mainly adopted the teaching profession and their basic aim is only to enlighten people about the basic divine message. Their living standard is very simple even though they had access to material gains. Some of the descendants of Syed Mir Mirak Andrabi left Kashmir valley and settled down in various parts of the sub-continent. Syed Mir Mohiu’d-din Andrabi best known by the name of Syed Gh. Rasool settled down at Wazirabad (Amritsar) and was buried there. Syed Saifu’d-din Andrabi and Syed Muhammad Shafi Andrabi Ratanpuri left the valley and settled down at Damukhee (Sialkot) to carry on their ancestral mission. At present, the total population of Andrabi Syeds is approximately twenty-five thousand in the valley. Andrabi Syeds does not believe in caste supremacy. Almost all the Andrabi Syeds of the valley used to assemble at Malaratta on the death anniversary of Syed Mir Mirak Andrabi celebrated on the fifth of Safar every year. Their relationship with other Sufis was very amicable especially approach was laconic and suffice in nature and always try to benefit from the knowledge of others. Most venerated Sufis of different orders were greatly inclined towards Qadriya Silsila through their teachings. The mention may be made of Suhrawardi Sufi Dawud Khaki{d.994.A.H./1586.A.D} disciple of Sheikh Hamza Makhdum, (d.984.A.H./ 23 March 1576. A.D).

Notable people with the surname

Shaykh Syed Mir Mirak Andrabi, 15th century Kasmiri Muslim scholar
Jalil Andrabi (died 1996), Kashmiri human rights lawyer and political activist 
Muhammed Amin Andrabi (1940–2001), Kashmiri writer

References 
 International Multidisciplinary Research Journal 2011, 1(11):05-08
ISSN: 2231-6302
Available Online: http://irjs.info/
 Ahmad, Syed. Tohfa Syed. Mss.3- 4-5.Research library Damsaz Ali University of Kashmir.
 Gamgeen, S.S. 1983. Genealogical history of Andrabi Syeds. Srinagar
 Sabur Ahmad Ibni.Khawariqus Salikeen. Mss.102-03. Research library Kashmir University
 Kamal Mir, Inshai Mir Kamal, Mss, 50, Research library University of Kashmir.

Indian surnames
Kashmiri-language surnames
Urdu-language surnames
Toponymic surnames
Nisbas
People from Baghlan Province